Paikallislehti Sisä-Savo is a Finnish newspaper published by Savon Media Oy. It was established in 1965.

The newspaper is published every Tuesday and Thursday.

In 2014, the circulation was 6479 in 2014. The paper came out 2 times per week and was delivered in the municipalities of Rautalampi, Suonenjoki, Tervo, Vesanto and Karttula.

References

External links
 Official site

1965 establishments in Finland
Finnish-language newspapers
Newspapers published in Finland
Rautalampi
Suonenjoki
Tervo
Vesanto
Karttula
Publications established in 1965